Beyuz or Boyuz may refer to:
 Beyuz, Esmailiyeh
 Beyuz, Gheyzaniyeh
 Beyuz-e Yek